Robert "Sput" Searight (born c. 1976) is an American drummer, composer and producer best known for his work with jazz fusion band Snarky Puppy and as co-founder of the percussion-based band Ghost-Note. His background spans several genres including jazz, funk, hip-hop and gospel. He has toured and recorded with a variety of artists including Kirk Franklin, Snoop Dogg, Justin Timberlake, Erykah Badu and Toto. He has received a Grammy award for his work on the album God's Property.

Life and career

Searight was born and raised in Dallas, Texas. He grew up in a musical family with a variety of instruments in his childhood home. His mother, Linda Searight, was an operatic singer and music teacher. He received his first drum kit at the age of five and started playing drums. He grew up listening to gospel music exclusively, but that changed at age eight with access to a diverse library of vinyl albums. He started taking music lessons in junior high school and, later, attended Booker T. Washington High School for the Performing Arts, where he played piano and received his first exposure to improvisation in the arts. He names gospel drummer Joel Smith as his biggest early influence.

In 1992, while in high school, Searight and his mother Linda founded the gospel choir God's Property. He studied jazz-piano and drums in junior college and then attended University of North Texas and majored in percussion. Soon after, in 1997, God's Property and Kirk Franklin collaborated to produce the eponymous album God's Property, for which Searight won a Grammy award in the category Best Gospel Choir or Chorus Album. He started touring extensively in support of the album and settled in Los Angeles. There, he worked as a drummer and producer with a variety of artists, including Snoop Dogg, Justin Timberlake, Kendrick Lamar and Timbaland.

In mid-2000s Searight moved back to Dallas and performed in the Dallas R&B-gospel music scene, working with Erykah Badu, Tamela Mann, The Clark Sisters and others. In weekly jam sessions he met members of the jazz fusion band Snarky Puppy, at the time a Dallas-based band. Around 2006, he joined Snarky Puppy, first as a keyboardist and then as a drummer. He has received three Grammys with the ensemble.  In 2014, Searight and Snarky Puppy percussionist Nate Werth founded Ghost-Note, a percussion-based funk-hip hop-jazz band. He has released two albums with Ghost-Note, Fortified in 2015 and Swagism in 2018. In 2020, he joined Toto as the band's drummer, and in 2022 he toured with the band on the Dogz of Oz tour.

Discography

God's Property
 God's Property from Kirk Franklin's Nu Nation (1997)

Ghost-Note
 Fortified (2015)
 Swagism (2018)

with Snarky Puppy
Bring Us the Bright (2008)
Tell Your Friends (2010)
GroundUP (2012)
Family Dinner – Volume 1 (2013)
Sylva with Metropole Orkest (2015)
Family Dinner – Volume 2 (2016)
Culcha Vulcha (2016)

with Toto
With a Little Help from My Friends (2021)

Sessions and production credits selected works

Notes

References

External links

Snarky Puppy drummers: Interview and gear, Modern Drummer magazine, 2016

1970s births
American jazz drummers
American funk drummers
Rhythm and blues drummers
American session musicians
American male drummers
Songwriters from Texas
Musicians from Dallas
21st-century American drummers
21st-century American male musicians
American male songwriters
African-American drummers
Living people
Year of birth unknown